The 2011 Swiss Cup Basel was held from September 30 to October 2 at the Curlingzentrum Region Basel in Arlesheim, Switzerland as part of the 2011–12 World Curling Tour. The purse for the event was CHF40,000, and the winner, Brad Gushue, received CHF13,000. It was held in a triple-knockout format. Gushue won in the final over Switzerland's Peter de Cruz with a score of 4–3.

Teams

Knockout results

A event

B event

C event

Playoffs

External links
Official site

2011 in curling
Cup Basel
Curling competitions in Switzerland